Ahar is a former town of historical significance, located on the north bank of the Ahar River in the present-day city of Udaipur, Rajasthan, in India.

History
Archeological excavations in the late 1950s and early 1960s revealed that Ahar was the site of the Chalcolithic Ahar culture. Two distinct cultures have been identified at the Ahar archeological site - Ahar Period I (2580 BC to 1500 BC) and Ahar Period II (1000 BC onwards).

In the pre-modern era, Ahar was a politically significant town after it became the capital of the Guhil rulers of Mewar in c.948 and stayed so until c.1116 when the capital moved to Nagda. Its other historical names are Aghatapura and Atpura.

See also 
 Ahar Cenotaphs

References

Udaipur district
Former capitals of Mewar